Suzanne Mohamed Mahmoud Ali Arafa (born 5 November 1994) is an American-born Egyptian footballer who plays as a midfielder. She has been a member of the Egypt women's national team.

Early life
Arafa was raised in Acworth, Georgia. Her father is Egyptian and her mother is American.

High school and college career
Arafa has attended the Allatoona High School in her hometown, the Kennesaw State University in Kennesaw, Georgia, California and the Georgia State University in Atlanta, Georgia.

International career
Arafa capped for Egypt at senior level during the 2016 Africa Women Cup of Nations.

References

1994 births
Living people
People with acquired Egyptian citizenship
Egyptian women's footballers
Women's association football midfielders
Egypt women's international footballers
Egyptian people of American descent
Sportspeople from Cobb County, Georgia
Soccer players from Georgia (U.S. state)
American women's soccer players
Kennesaw State Owls women's soccer players
Georgia State Panthers women's soccer players
American sportspeople of African descent
American people of Egyptian descent